Genes is a Indian Tamil-language reality television game show broadcast on Zee Tamil.  It was initially premiered from the year 2015 also available to watch on digital platform ZEE5. This show is remake of Genes which is aired on ETV Telugu. The show about identify real people by connecting with their genetic similarities. The show has four rounds- Same to Same, Celebrity round, Family Tree and Jackpot. The show was launched on 19 April 2015 and aired weekly on every Sunday 8:00PM (IST).

Seasons overview

Season 1
The first season aired every Sunday at 8:00PM from 19 April 2015 to 11 October 2015 and ended with 26 Episodes. The show was hosted by Suma Kanakala.

Guests included

Season 2

The show second season was launched on 18 November 2015 and aired weekly on every Sunday 8:00PM IST. The show is hosted by Tamil Actress Roja. The second season has four interesting rounds 1+1=3, Celebrity Round, Anniyan and Vilayadu Mangatha. The couple starts off the show well and play the game enthusiastically.

Season 3

The third season was premiered on 17 June 2018. The show hosted by actress Priya Raman replacing fellow actress Roja who previously hosted the first two editions of the game show.

References

External links
 Genes at ZEE5

Zee Tamil original programming
2015 Tamil-language television series debuts
Tamil-language children's television series
Tamil-language game shows
Tamil-language television shows
2015 Tamil-language television seasons
Television shows set in Tamil Nadu
Tamil-language television series based on Telugu-language television series